The 2012 Louisiana Democratic presidential primary was held on March 24, 2012.

President Barack Obama received little opposition in the 2012 Democratic primaries, handily winning overall with over 88% of the vote. However, Tennessee attorney and perennial political candidate John Wolfe Jr. challenged President Obama in the primaries, and received nearly 12% of the vote. Entrepreneur Bob Ely and historian Darcy Richardson also participated, and received a little over 6% and 5% of the vote, respectively. On the date of the primary, President Obama swept nearly every parish in the state, with Wolfe winning LaSalle, Grant, and Cameron parishes. 

Although Wolfe qualified for four delegates, the Louisiana Democratic Party announced that they would not award the delegates to Wolfe on technical grounds.

Results

See also 

 2012 Louisiana Republican presidential primary
 2012 Democratic Party presidential primaries
 2012 United States presidential election in Louisiana

References

Louisiana
Democratic primary
2012